Silas Adekunle is a Nigerian inventor and technology entrepreneur known for creating the world's first intelligent gaming robot.

Professional life 
Adekunle co-founded and was the CEO of Reach Robotics, a UK-based augmented reality gaming company that created robots for gaming and STEM education. The startup developed a 4-legged robot with lifelike movement called MekaMon.
The system animated video game by combining robotics with augmented reality. Reach Robotics also developed an app, which controled the MekaMon and acted as a portal to digital content. Adekunle received $12 million from investors, including London Venture Partners, allowing the company to expand to about 65 full-time employees at its peak.

In 2018, Adekunle partnered with Apple, signing an exclusive distribution deal to sell his product in both the United States and Britain. Reach Robotics shut down on Sept. 2, 2019 due to "inherent challenges in the consumer robotics sector".

Adekunle is now focused on using MekaMon to develop the Robotics education ecosystem across Africa and cloud infrastructure for industrial automation in the UK. He founded the company Awarri, which aims to enable the development and adaptation of advanced AI and robotics technology in Africa. The company aims to help developers to quickly and securely implement the cloud infrastructure needed to remotely monitor, manage and control their robots, industrial automation and IOT devices.

Honours 
In November 2018, Adekunle was named to the Financial Times' list of the "Top 100 minority ethnic leaders in technology". In the same year, he was selected for the Forbes 30 Under 30 Europe 2018: Technology list.

Education and personal life 
Adekunle was born in Nigeria and moved to the UK when he was 12. He earned a first class degree in robotics and an Honorary Degree of Doctor of Technology from the University of the West of England, Bristol.

References 

Year of birth missing (living people)
Living people
Artificial intelligence researchers
Nigerian technology businesspeople
Yoruba businesspeople
Nigerian inventors
Nigerian roboticists
Yoruba engineers
Alumni of the University of the West of England, Bristol